Phalarotortrix is a genus of moths belonging to the subfamily Tortricinae of the family Tortricidae. Both species in the genus were originally described in Cnephasia.

Species
Phalarotortrix phalarocosma (Meyrick, 1937)
Phalarotortrix ergastularis (Meyrick, 1911)

Etymology
The generic name is a combination of the name Tortrix and part of the name of the type-species, from Greek phalaris (meaning kind of grass).

See also
List of Tortricidae genera

References

Archipini
Moth genera
Taxa named by Józef Razowski